The 1968 World Amateur Snooker Championship was the third edition of the championship that later became known as the IBSF World Snooker Championship, the first event having been held in 1963. The 1968 tournament was played in Australia with two round-robin groups, one held in Adelaide and one on Melbourne, and the semi-finals and final being played at the Hordern Pavilion, Sydney.

David Taylor of England defeated Max Williams of Australia 8–7 in the final to win the title. Taylor also made the highest , 96.

Qualifying groups
Matches in the qualifying groups were all played between 16 and 20 September.

Group A, played at the Albert Park table tennis stadium, Melbourne.

Group B, played at Australia Hall, Adelaide.

Knockout
The semi-final between Williams and van Renberg was played on 29 and 30 September; the semi-final between Taylor and Morgan was played on 1 and 2 October; the final was played on 3 and 4 October.

References

Snooker amateur tournaments
International sports competitions hosted by Australia
1968 in snooker
Sports competitions in Sydney